XHPEDJ-FM is a radio station on 95.3 FM in Encarnación de Díaz, Jalisco. It is known as Gallo FM. The station broadcasts from a tower atop Cerro de los Gallos, the mountain used to provide TV service to Encarnación de Díaz and Aguascalientes, but its signal is directional toward Encarnación and away from Aguascalientes.

History
XHPEDJ was awarded in the IFT-4 radio auction of 2017. The station signed on in the summer of 2018.

References

Radio stations in Jalisco
Radio stations established in 2018
2018 establishments in Mexico